"The Husbands of River Song" is an episode of the British science fiction television series Doctor Who. First broadcast on BBC One on 25 December 2015, it is the eleventh Christmas special since the show's revival in 2005. It was written by Steven Moffat and directed by Douglas Mackinnon. The episode marks the return of Alex Kingston as River Song, making her first appearance alongside Peter Capaldi's Twelfth Doctor, and also her last on screen appearance to date. This also features the first appearance of Nardole, who would become a companion starting from the next episode.

Plot
In 5343 on the human colony of Mendorax Dellora, the Twelfth Doctor is mistaken by a servant, Nardole, for a surgeon hired by River Song to attend to her dying husband, King Hydroflax. River, who is unfamiliar with his new set of regenerations, fails to recognize the Doctor as she takes him aside and tells him to decapitate Hydroflax so she can claim the Halassi Androvar, the most valuable diamond in the universe, which has become lodged in the king’s brain.

However, they are interrupted by Hydroflax, who overhears them. Being a cyborg, he detaches his head from his mechanical body and orders it to kill them. While River defends herself, the Doctor grabs Hydroflax's head and threatens to put him in the garbage disposal, creating a stalemate and allowing Ramone, River's actual husband, to teleport her, the Doctor, and Hydroflax’s head outside. Believing Nardole to have information about River, Hydroflax’s body decapitates him to use his head as its own.

River and Ramone track down the TARDIS and attempt to take off with the Doctor, but the ship's safeguards prevent it from taking off when it detects that Hydroflax’s head and body, although separated, are still linked to one another. Left behind, Hydroflax’s body tricks and uploads Ramone before following a homing beacon emitted by his head. Using Ramone, it forces its way inside, causing the TARDIS to travel to the starship Harmony and Redemption, where River requests that the maître d’, Flemming, deadlock seal the baggage hold where the TARDIS landed to prevent Hydroflax’s body from pursuing them further.

Rather than return the diamond to the Halassi, River reveals that she intends to sell the diamond to a buyer named Scratch, who has secretly filled the meeting point with members of his own species. After receiving payment, River and the Doctor discover that Scratch and his compatriots worship Hydroflax and are after the diamond in his honour. Despite attempts to hide the bagged head containing the diamond, Flemming stops them from escaping–after being tricked into entering the baggage area by an under-duress Ramone–but promises the Doctor's head to Hydroflax's body using River as bait. Sensing that Hydroflax's head will die imminently, his body destroys it, leaving only the diamond. Flemming interrogates River for the Doctor's whereabouts, but she explains that although she loves the Doctor, he does not reciprocate before realizing the Doctor was with her all along.

Being a time traveler, River knows the ship is about to be crippled by a meteor strike, which she uses as their escape plan, taking the diamond in the process. The Doctor uses Scratch’s universal bank transfer device to overload Hydroflax’s body before heading to the ship’s bridge. As the ship is crashing, River discovers that they are heading towards the planet Darillium, which the Doctor remembers is where she spends her last night with him before her death. Realizing that they cannot save the ship, River and the Doctor flee into the TARDIS, but the impact knocks her unconscious.

Having avoided taking River to Darillium for as long as possible, the Doctor decides to give in to the inevitable. After traveling to the next morning, the Doctor suggests to a man searching for survivors that he build a restaurant with a view of Darillium's Singing Towers, and gives him the diamond to fund its construction. Traveling forward in time once again, the Doctor books a table on the balcony for Christmas Day in four years’ time. When River awakens and exits the TARDIS into the restaurant, she is told that the Doctor is waiting for her. She encounters Hydroflax’s body, since salvaged and now peacefully controlled by Ramone and Nardole's heads, working as a waiter in the restaurant.

The Doctor gives River a sonic screwdriver, the same one she has in "Forest of the Dead". As the pair admire the Singing Towers, River asks whether this really is their last night together. The Doctor insists that there is no way to avoid the end of their times together and refuses to tell River the future, though he comforts her by revealing that one night on Darillium lasts for twenty-four years, allowing them to enjoy a happy romance together.

Continuity
Ramone shows pictures of the Doctor's original twelve faces, which River mentions having in order to recognise the Doctor in "The Time of Angels" (2010). River doesn't recognise the Twelfth Doctor as the Doctor because "he has limits", referring to the Time Lords' twelve-regenerations limit first mentioned in The Deadly Assassin (1976).

As he reads River's diary, Flemming relates many of her adventures with the Doctor: the opening of the Pandorica ("The Pandorica Opens"), the crash of the Byzantium (first mentioned in "Silence in the Library" and shown in "Flesh and Stone"), a picnic at Asgard (mentioned in "Silence in the Library"), an encounter with Jim the Fish (mentioned in "The Impossible Astronaut"), and her most recent trip – to a place called "Manhattan" ("The Angels Take Manhattan").

The Doctor tells River that "every Christmas is last Christmas", repeating what a dream-image Danny Pink tells Clara Oswald in "Last Christmas" (2014).

When the Doctor argues about River's "marriages", River recounts some of the Doctor's own: Elizabeth I (first mentioned in "The End of Time" and depicted in "The Day of the Doctor"), Marilyn Monroe ("A Christmas Carol"), and Cleopatra (mentioned in "The Wedding of River Song").

Details of the Doctor's last encounter with River at the singing towers of Darillium, originally mentioned in "Forest of the Dead" (2008), are shown here. The Doctor says that he has just had a haircut and is wearing his best suit ("You turned up on my doorstep, with a new haircut and a suit"). As the towers sing, the Doctor sheds a tear ("The towers sang and you cried"), and he refuses to tell her that this is their final night together before her death ("You wouldn't tell me why, but I suppose you knew it was time. My time.") River mentions that the Doctor had postponed it several times, one of which was shown in the mini-episode "Last Night".

The Doctor uses both of River's catchphrases – "Hello, Sweetie" and "Spoilers". River's last line to the Doctor is "I hate you", to which the Doctor replies "No, you don't". This is banter River and the Eleventh Doctor often used, such as in "The Impossible Astronaut". River is also shown as possessing a red fez, a favourite headpiece of the Eleventh Doctor.

Outside references
The Doctor says that a flow chart is required to follow his and River's timelines; when he learns she's married another man, he says "I think I'm going to need a bigger flow chart". This echoes a line from the film Jaws: "You're gonna need a bigger boat", as well as the creation by fans of Doctor Who of flow charts to depict the Doctor and River's relative timelines.

One of River's other husbands the Doctor names is actor Stephen Fry.

Production

Filming
The read through for the episode took place on 31 August 2015, with the special being filmed between 1 and 26 September 2015.

Cast notes
In September 2015, it was announced that Alex Kingston would reprise the role of recurring character River Song for the first time since the 2013 episode "The Name of the Doctor". Then in November 2015, it was revealed that the special's guest cast would include Greg Davies as King Hydroflax and Matt Lucas as Nardole.

Broadcast and reception
The episode had an official rating of 7.69 million viewers in the UK with a 33.9% share. The chart position was 8th for the week and 7th for Christmas Day. The overnight rating was 5.77 million with a 29.4% share of the total TV audience at 5.15pm.  It received an Appreciation Index score of 82.

Cinemas
The episode had a cinema release in Russia, Ukraine, Belarus and Kazakhstan on 25 and 26 December, and in the United States on 28 and 29 December. The cinema releases included an additional interview with Alex Kingston and a behind-the-scenes featurette.

Critical reception

The episode received positive reviews. It holds an approval rating of 95% on Rotten Tomatoes, based on 19 reviews, and an average score of 7.58. The critic's consensus reads "With The Husbands of River Song, Doctor Who delivers a Christmas special that perfectly balances silliness and heart."

Accolades
At the 42nd Saturn Awards, the episode won the Best Television Presentation and Alex Kingston was nominated for Best Guest Star on Television.

Home media
"The Husbands of River Song" was released on DVD and Blu-ray on 25 January 2016 in Region 2, 27 January 2016 in Region 4, and 23 February 2016 in Region 1. A complete box set for the ninth series, including "The Husbands of River Song", was released on 7 March 2016 in Region 2, and 5 April 2016 in Region 1.

References

External links

 
 
 

Twelfth Doctor episodes
2015 British television episodes
Television episodes written by Steven Moffat
Doctor Who Christmas specials
Fiction set in the 6th millennium
Television episodes set in outer space